Anderson Daronco (born 5 January 1981) is an association football referee. He has worked as a referee in the Campeonato Gaúcho, the Copa do Nordeste, Campeonato Brasileiro and the Copa do Brasil.

Early life 
Anderson Daronco played handball from ten to twenty-one years. In 1998 he entered the Faculty of Physical Education.

He underwent a referee course at the Federação Gaúcha de Futebol and later had to quit his career as a Physical Education teacher to devote more time to refereeing.

On 30 October 2014, he became a FIFA referee, making him the third Gaucho member to join the FIFA referee group, along with Leandro Pedro Vuaden. He revealed that his aspires to one day officiate at a World Cup. He was selected to take part in the 2018 FIFA World Cup.

Career 
During the 2018 Campeonato Gaúcho, a photo and false news involving Daronco went viral. To ascertain the evidence, newspaper GaúchaZH subsidiary of  Zero Hora got Professor Robert Tieztman, the coordinator of the research group ViDiCa Cultural Cultura Audiovisual Digital at PUCRS to study the images. He proofed that the information was false through a video showing five "grotesque" errors between the original and the fake photo.

In January 2019, Daronco reported that the director of the Veranópolis, Ademir Bertoglio uttered several curses against him and his referee team during the game. Later, a fan wearing a Veranópolis shirt also invaded the locker rooms, cursed and threatened the referees with death.

The Court of Sports Justice of Rio Grande do Sul (TJD-RS) studied the case and somehow denounced the VEC due to the threats directed at the arbitrators. In an article written for GauchaZH, journalist Diori Vasconcelos said that there are no reasons to justify the threats directed at referees and that some strong measures should be taken by the Gaucho Football Federation. "Things went beyond all limits, not only because of what happened in Veranópolis. We are experiencing a lot Gauchão in which the president of Pelotas was punched in the face of a 'fan.' What else will need to happen for action to be taken? " 

In July 2019, the incident and his life was used as one of the themes of a series of parodies by Marcelo Adnet , " Soy loco por Copa América " , showcased on Rede Globo , which addressed the fact that the Daronco does not accept insults and that his stature and athletic appearance made him stay known as "strong judge".  In August 2019, Daronco stopped a game between Vasco da Gama and São Paulo due to homophobic screams uttered by the Vasco fans. The posture was praised by the Brazilian Football Confederation. It was the first time that a football match was interrupted in Brazil due to homophobic chants.

Later, Daronco explained that the reason of stopping the game "is not something in my head. We have an orientation in this direction. (…) we don't just stick to a homophobic chant, there's a whole issue involving racism, or facts that can incite violence, such as banners in the field and xenophobic chants."

On August 30, 2020, after a game featuring Grêmio versus Caxias game, comments about Daronco's stature and physical presence went viral on social media, gaining coverage in the Spanish-language press.

On March 27, 2022, after an international football match between Peru and Uruguay, Peruvian newspaper El Comercio and other international media outlets criticized Daronco for a supposed history of refereeing favorable for the Uruguayan side. According to sports journalist Marco Quilca Leon, Daronco declined to use goal-line technology after a highly controversial play at the 92 minute, where it seemed that Uruguay goalkeeper Sergio Rochet stopped a ball inside his own goal. The Peruvian Football Federation filed an official complaint to FIFA against Daronco after the match.

Personal life 
He is married to Luciane Daronco. He has two children, Arthur and Hector Daronco.  He keeps his family life private away from the public due to the risks related to being a referee.

Daronco was born and lives in Maria, Rio Grande do Sul where some of his Physical Education students died in the Kiss nightclub fire in 2013 when was a PE instructor and teacher. In 2015, during the 2015 Brazilian Nationals, Daronco was involved in 27 matches, setting a record of the highest matches officiated in Brazil within that period.  In the process he received an amount of 100,000 reais the highest amount. In 2017, he referred 21 matches again the most from Rio Grande do Sul which also translated to 84,000 reais. Daranco stated that his passion for the sport made him muscular even though that was not his intention.

In 2017, he weighed 90 kg, after losing around 3 or 4 kg, due to the advice of committees and physical instructors who cautioned and advised him to reduce the extra weight to avoid problems in his career in the short and long term. With his weight he is able to run 40 meters in less than six seconds and trains practically every day due to his job.

References

External links 
 Official Profile at CBF

 Anderson Daronco interview de Santa Maria (em vídeo)

1981 births
Living people
Brazilian football referees
People from Santa Maria, Rio Grande do Sul
Copa América referees